Queer theory is a field of post-structuralism that emerged in the early 1990s out of queer studies (often, formerly, gay and lesbian studies) and women's studies. The term can have various meanings depending upon its usage, but has broadly been associated with the study and theorisation of gender and sexual practices that exist outside of heterosexuality, and which challenge the notion that heterosexual desire is ‘normal’. Following social constructivist developments in sociology, queer theorists are often critical of what they consider essentialist views of sexuality and gender. Instead, they study those concepts as social and cultural phenomena, often through an analysis of the categories, binaries, and language in which they are said to be portrayed.

History

Informal use of the term "queer theory" began with Gloria Anzaldúa and other scholars in the 1990s, themselves influenced by the work of French post-structuralist philosopher Michel Foucault, who viewed sexuality as socially constructed and rejected identity politics. Teresa de Lauretis organized the first queer theory conference in 1990. David Halperin, an early queer theorist, writes in his article "The Normalization of Queer Theory" that de Lauretis' usage was somewhat controversial at first, as she chose to combine the word "queer" which was just starting to be used in a "gay-affirmative sense by activists, street kids, and members of the art world," and the word "theory" which was seen as very academically weighty.  In the early 1990s, the term started to become legitimized in academia.

Although it is an academic discipline that gained traction within academia, queer theory's roots can also be traced back to activism, with the reclaiming of the derogatory term "queer" as an umbrella term for those who do not identify with heteronormativity in the 1980s. This would continue on in the 1990s, with Queer Nation's use of "queer" in their protest chants, such as "We're here! We're queer! Get used to it!"

Other early queer theorists include Eve Kosofsky Sedgwick, Michael Warner, Lauren Berlant, Judith Butler, and Adrienne Rich.

Definition
According to Jay Stewart, "Queer theory and politics necessarily celebrate transgression in the form of visible difference from norms. These 'Norms' are then exposed to be norms, not natures or inevitabilities. Gender and sexual identities are seen, in much of this work, to be demonstrably defiant definitions and configurations."

In an influential essay, Michael Warner argued that queerness is defined by what he called ‘heteronormativity'; those ideas, narratives and discourses which suggest that heterosexuality is the default, preferred, or normal mode of sexual orientation. Warner stated that while many thinkers had been theorising sexuality from a non-heterosexual perspective for perhaps a century, queerness represented a distinctive contribution to social theory for precisely this reason. Lauren Berlant and Warner further developed these ideas in their seminal essay, "Sex in Public". Critics such as Edward Carpenter, Guy Hocquenghem and Jeffrey Weeks had emphasised what they called the ‘necessity of thinking about sexuality as a field of power, as a historical mode of personality, and as the site of an often critical utopian aim’. Whereas the terms 'homosexual', ‘gay’ or ‘lesbian’ which they used signified particular identities with stable referents (i.e to a certain cultural form, historical context, or political agenda whose meanings can be analysed sociologically), the word ‘queer’ is instead defined in relation to a range of practices, behaviours and issues that have meaning only in their shared contrast to categories which are alleged to be 'normal'. Such a focus highlights the indebtedness of queer theory to the concept of normalisation found in the sociology of deviance, particularly through the work of Michel Foucault, who studied the normalisation of heterosexuality in his work The History of Sexuality.

In The History of Sexuality, Foucault argues that repressive structures in society police the discourse concerning sex and sexuality and are thus relegated in the private sphere. As a result, heterosexuality is normalized while homosexuality (or queerness) is stigmatized. Foucault then points out that this imposed secrecy has led to sexuality as a phenomenon that needs to be frequently confessed and examined. Foucault's work is particularly important to queer theory in that he describes sexuality as a phenomenon that "must not be thought of as a kind of natural given which power tries to hold in check" but rather "a historical construct." Judith Butler extends this idea of sexuality as a social construct to gender identity in Gender Trouble: Feminism and the Subversion of Identity, where she theorizes that gender is not a biological reality but rather something that is performed through repeated actions.

Because this definition of queerness does not have a fixed reference point, Judith Butler has described the subject of queer theory as a site of ‘collective contestation’. They suggest that ‘queer’ as a term should never be ‘fully owned, but always and only redeployed, twisted, queered from a prior usage and in the direction of urgent and expanding political purposes’. While proponents argue that this flexibility allows for the constant readjustment of queer theory to accommodate the experiences of people who face marginalisation and discrimination on account of their sexuality and gender, critics allege that such a 'subjectless critique', as it is often called, runs the risk of abstracting cultural forms from their social structure, political organization, and historical context, reducing social theory to a mere 'textual idealism'.

Analysis of same-sex partnerships
Queer theory deals with the micro level - the identity of the individual person, the meso level - the individual in their immediate groups such as family, friends, and work, and the macro level - the larger context of society, culture, politics, policies and law. Accordingly, queer theory not only examines the communities surrounding the queer people, but also the communities they form. Same-sex living communities have a significant priority in the formation of a queer theory. The standard work of Andreas Frank, "Committed Sensations", highlights comprehensively the life situation of coming-out, homosexuality and same-sex communities to the millennium.

Queer theory and communication studies 
As an interdisciplinary concept, queer theory is applied to different disciplines, including communication studies and research. It was introduced to the field of communication through Jeffrey Ringer's Queer Words, Queer Images: Communication and the Construction of Homosexuality in 1994, which offered a queer perspective to communication research findings. Queer theory has also contributed to communication research by challenging the heteronormative society's notions of what's considered deviant and taboo—what is considered normative and non-normative.

Queering family communication
Queer theory's interdisciplinarity is evident in its application in and critique of family communication. One of the criticisms regarding family communication is its focus on "mainstream" families, often focusing on heterosexual parents and children.

Although more studies on family communication have started to include nontraditional families, critical rhetorical scholar Roberta Chevrette argues that researchers continue to look at nontraditional families, including families with openly queer members, from a heteronormative lens. That is, when studying LGBTQ+ families, many scholars continue to compare these families to their cis-heterosexual counterparts' norms. As Chevrette writes, "Queering family communication requires challenging ideas frequently taken for granted and thinking about sexual identities as more than check marks."

Chevrette describes four ways that scholars can "queer" family communication: (1) revealing the biases and heteronormative assumptions in family communication; (2) challenging the treatment of sexuality and queerness as a personal and sensitive topic reserved for the private sphere rather than the public; (3) interpreting identity as a socially constructed phenomenon and sexuality as being fluid in order to expose the ways gender roles and stereotypes are reinforced by notions of identity and sexuality as being fixed; and (4) emphasizing intersectionality and the importance of studying different identity markers in connection with each other.

Lens for power
Queer theory is the lens used to explore and challenge how scholars, activists, artistic texts, and the media perpetrate gender- and sex-based binaries, and its goal is to undo hierarchies and fight against social inequalities. Due to controversy about the definition of queer, including whether the word should even be defined at all or should be left deliberately open-ended, there are many disagreements and often contradictions within queer theory. In fact, some queer theorists, like Berlant and Warner and Butler, have warned that defining it or conceptualizing it as an academic field might only lead to its inevitable misinterpretation or destruction, since its entire purpose is to critique academia rather than become a formal academic domain itself.

Fundamentally, queer theory does not construct or defend any particular identity, but instead, grounded in post-structuralism and deconstruction, it works to actively critique heteronormativity, exposing and breaking down traditional assumptions that sexual and gender identities are presumed to be heterosexual or cisgender.

Queer theory in online discourse
One of the ways queer theory has made its way into online discourse is through the popularity of Adrienne Rich's 1980 essay, "Compulsory Heterosexuality and Lesbian Existence." Rich's theory regarding compulsory heterosexuality (or comp-het)—the socio-cultural expectation that women must be attracted to men and desire a romantic heterosexual relationship—inspired the creation of the "Lesbian Masterdoc", a 30-page Google Document originally written in 2018 by Anjeli Luz, a Tumblr user who was in the midst of questioning her own sexuality as a teenager.

Katelyn McKenna and John Bargh’s studies of online groups consisting of marginalized groups found an interesting phenomenon called “identity demarginalization” — how participation in a group consisting of people with shared marginalized identity can lead to a higher level of self-acceptance, which could lead to eventually coming out to their friends and family.

Online groups and interactions also contribute to normalizing queerness and challenging heteronormativity by serving as a networked counterpublic. Sarah Jackson, Moya Bailey, and Brooke Foucault Welles’ discourse analysis of the hashtag #GirlsLikeUs shows how trans women have used the hashtag to build community in ways that normalize being trans and offering counter-narratives to the often stereotypical and caricatured portrayal of trans people’s lives in popular mainstream media.

See also
Queer archaeology
Queer of color critique
Queer theology

References

External links